Institute of Culture was an institution of vocational education established in the Soviet Union and still existing in some post-Soviet states, aimed at training of workers in various areas of culture and organization of leisure activities.

History
The Soviet establishment paid considerable attention to planning of the organization of the activities of Soviet people in their spare time, to combat  hard drinking, hooliganism and other crime, especially among younger generation. The phrase "cultural leisure" (культурный досуг) was among the Soviet cliches: supposedly the proper organization of the cultural leisure of the Soviet people was the major tool in combatting the "vestiges of capitalism" and the molding of the "New Soviet Man".

Institutes of Culture were the institutions to train the professional "organizers of the cultural leisure", such as heads of hobby groups, of dance schools and collectives, folk dance and music ensembles, managers of various sections of Palaces of Culture, managers of "culture-educational work" in various schools, Young Pioneer camps, etc.

Education in the Soviet Union
Soviet culture